Seymour Jonathan Singer (May 23, 1924 – February 2, 2017) was an American cell biologist and professor of biology, emeritus, at the University of California, San Diego.

Biography 
Singer was born in New York City and attended Columbia University, where he earned his B.A. in 1943. He received his doctorate from the Polytechnic Institute of Brooklyn in 1947. He worked as a postdoctoral fellow in the lab of Linus Pauling at Caltech during 1947–1948, where he, along with Harvey Itano, co-discovered the basis of abnormal hemoglobin in sickle-cell anemia, reported in the famous paper "Sickle Cell Anemia, a Molecular Disease".  He worked for the U.S. Public Health Service between 1948 and 1950. He joined the Chemistry Department at Yale University as assistant professor in 1951, and was promoted to Associate Professor in 1957 and Professor in 1960. There he developed the ferritin-antibody, which was the first electron-dense reagent used for cell staining in electron microscopy imaging.  He was awarded a Guggenheim Fellowship for Molecular & Cellular Biology in 1959.

In 1961 he joined the faculty at University of California, San Diego as a Professor in the Department (now Division) of Biology. He initiated the landmark work on the conformation of membrane proteins in 1965, resulting in the publication of two foundational papers (Lenard, John and Singer, S.J. Protein conformation in cell membrane preparations as studied by optical rotatory dispersion and circular dichroism. Proceedings of the National Academy of Sciences 56, 1828–1835, 1966; Lenard, John and Singer, S. J. Structure of membranes: Reaction of red cell membranes with phospholipase C. Science 159, 738, 1968). His seminal work on membrane proteins resulted in the development of the "Fluid Mosaic Model" of the cell membrane, published as  "The Fluid Mosaic Model of the Structure of Cell Membranes", in Science in 1972. He later made important discoveries on the interaction between the cytoskeleton and the cell membrane, resulting in, among other things, the identification of the cytoskeletal proteins vinculin and talin.

Dr. Singer was elected to the National Academy of Sciences in 1969, the American Academy of Arts and Sciences in 1971, and held an American Cancer Society Research Professorship from 1976 to 1991. He has won awards including the E.B. Wilson Medal from the American Society for Cell Biology, and was a University Professor of the University of California, an honor awarded to only 41 members of the UC faculty since it was initiated in 1960, from 1988 until his retirement in 1995.

In 2001, he published a book, The Splendid Feast of Reason, regarding rationalism and the philosophy of science. He died in La Jolla on February 2, 2017.

References

1924 births
2017 deaths
American biologists
Fellows of the American Academy of Arts and Sciences
Members of the United States National Academy of Sciences
University of California, San Diego faculty
Cell biologists
Yale University faculty
New York University alumni
Columbia College (New York) alumni